Spookey were a Manchester soul band of the 1970s who recorded for Decca Records.

Discography
A: "Mama's Little Girl" / B: "Magic"; producer Choonika, arranged Marvin Marshall 1978 
A: "Someone Oughta' Write A Song About You Baby" / B: "Times"  1979
A: "Who's Taken The Lid Off This Affair?" / B: "In Your Heart" 1979
A: "On The Rocks" / B: "Friends" Satril Records 1981

References

British soul musical groups